American Burger is a 2014 Swedish comedy horror film starring Fredrik Hiller, Liam Macdonald, Benjamin Brook, Aggy Kukawka and Ben Thornton. It is directed by first-time feature film director's Johan Bromander & Bonita Drake.

The film was released was released globally online via Movieboosters on 17 October 2014.

Plot
American Burger follows the stories of a bunch of stereotypical American school students (Nerds, Jocks & Cheerleaders) on a culture trip through Europe. Among the students are Fat Nerd (Liam Macdonald) & Preppy Nerd (Benjamin Brook), Camera Nerd (Charlie Petersson) & Wonky Eyes Nerd (Ben Thorton) and Nice Cheerleader (Aggy K. Adams), Adorable Cheerleader (Madeleine Borg) & Ponytail Cheerleader (Hanna Nygren). Heading the group is the enthusiastic Teacher (Lena Bengtsson) who tries her hardest to ensure the children appreciate their trip.

The students soon find their way to the mystical country of Kraketch, whose main source of economy is the American Burger Factory run by Demented Butcher (Fredrik Hiller). The school students are invited to tour the factory, but not before Demented Butcher orders his Butchers to kill the students and bring them into the factory. Several students escape and form unlikely pacts: Fat Nerd, Preppy Nerd, Wonky Eyes Nerd (whose name is later revealed to actually be 'Mike) & Ponytail Cheerleader and Camera Nerd, Jock, Quarterback & Nice Cheerleader for the other. Adorable Cheerleader loses the others and runs off by herself as does Teacher.

Slowly, the Butchers hunt, stalk and kill the students. Preppy Nerd is kidnapped by butchers, thinking he is already dead; Adorable Cheerleader hilariously loses almost all her clothes and now speaks with a lisp after eating poison berries; Fat Nerd steals a dead Butcher's outfit and escapes to the main road leading out of Kraketch and Nice Cheerleader & Camera Nerd run to escape a horde of butchers.

Whilst at the American Burger factory waiting to be slaughtered, it is discovered that Preppy Nerd is actually a Canadian. A disgusted Demented Butcher apologises profusely and allows Preppy Nerd to leave with his blessings. Preppy Nerd then locates the student's bus and drives away from the factory.

On the way out of Kraketch, Preppy Nerd locates some of his classmates. He first picks up Adorable Cheerleader, then Fat Nerd & Teacher before saving Nice Cheerleader from a horde of Butchers. The gang drive away in the school bus and leave Kraketch for good.

Cast
 Fredrik Hiller as Demented Butcher
 Liam Macdonald as Fat Nerd
 Benjamin Brook as Preppy Nerd
 Ben Thornton as Mike, Wonky Eyes Nerd
 Aggy K. Adams as Nice Cheerleader
 Madeleine Borg as Adorable Cheerleader
 Lena Bengtsson as Teacher
 Charlie Petersson as Camera Nerd
 Gabriel Freilich as Quarterback
 Hjalmar Strid as Jock

Reception
American Burger received mixed reviews from critics although its technical aspects were praised. Borg & Macdonald were also praised for their roles as Adorable Cheerleader & Fat Nerd respectively by the Ostersund Posten.

Proposed sequel
A sequel to American Burger, called American Burger 2: Back to Kraketch is currently in development. Hiller, Macdonald, Brook, Kukawka & Borg are all expected to reprise their roles.

Filming locations
All filming took place in Östersund, Sweden.

References

External links

2014 films
2014 horror films
Swedish slasher films
2010s English-language films
2010s Swedish films